Miss Earth 2005, the 5th edition of the Miss Earth pageant, was held on October 23, 2005, in Quezon City, Philippines. A total of 80 candidates from around the globe took part in the event.

At the conclusion of the pageant, Alexandra Braun of Venezuela was crowned Miss Earth 2005 by outgoing titleholder, Miss Earth 2004, Priscilla Meirelles of Brazil. Like Brazil, Venezuela made history by becoming the second country to win all the Big Four international beauty pageants.

Results

Placements

Special awards

Order of announcements

Top 16

Top 8

Top 4

Judges

Contestants
Countries and delegates that participated in Miss Earth 2005:

  – Sitara Bahrami
  – Eliana Ocolotobiche
  – Anne-Maree Bowdler
  – Nadia Cash
  – Isabel van Rompaey
  – Vanessa Patricia Morón Jarzun
  – Sanja Susnja
  – Isabella Chaves
  – Mealea Pich
  – Wonja Ngeah Ginette Martine
  – Katherine McClure
  – Nataly Chilet
  – Noelle Li Yi-Jia
  – Lia Patricia Correal Lopera
  – Zuzana Štěpanovská
  – Heidi Zadeh
  – Amell Santana
  – Cristina Eugenia Reyes Hidalgo
  – Elham Wagdi
  – Irma Marina Dimas Pineda
  – Anastassija Balak
  – Rita Aaltolahti
  – Alexandra Uhan
  – Rebecca Kunikowski
  – Faustina Adjao Akoto
  – Channa Cius
  – Ruth María Arita
  – Aisha Gu Reu
  – Niharika Singh
  – Jenny Graciella Jevinzky Sutjiono
  – Avivit Meirson
  – Daisi Pollard
  – Emi Suzuki
  – Stella Malis
  – Hye-mi Yoo
  – Nora Reinholde
  – Chantal Karam
  – Rebecca Qian Qiong
  – Jana Stojanovska
  – Jamie Pang Hui Ting
  – Elle Narayanan
  – Loshanee Moodaley
  – Lorena Jaime Hochstrasser
  – Sarnai Amar
  – Shavona Shrestha
  – Dagmar Saija
  – Tiffany Pickford
  – Sandra Maritza Ríos Hernández
  – Ethel Okosuns
  – Ngiar Pearson
  – Vibeke Hansen
  – Naomi Zaman
  – Rosemary Isabel Suárez Machazek
  – Tania María Domaniczky Vargas
  – Sara María Paredes Valdivia
  – Genebelle Francisco Raagas
  – Katarzyna Weronika Borowicz
  – Ângela Maria Fonseca Spínola
  – Vanessa De Roide
  – Adina Dimitru
  – Tatyana Yamova
  – Hanna Gabrielle Fitz
  – Josephine Meisake
  – Jovana Marjanovic
  – Sim Pei Yee
  – Diana Ondrejickova
  – Jacqueline Postma
  – Therese Denitton
  – Vaimiti Herlaud
  – Carolyn Lin Yi-Fan
  – Rehema Sudi
  – Kanokwan Sesthaphongvanich
  – Landy Tyrell
  – Trina Adams
  – Yevgeniya Rudenko
  – Emma Corten
  – Amanda Kimmel
  – Alexandra Braun
  – Đào Thanh Hoài
  – Cynthia Kanema

Notes

Debuts

Replacements
  is technically new, as it was designated in the previous years as "Great Britain".

Returns

Last competed in 2001:
 
 
Last competed in 2003:

Withdrawals

References

External links

 
 Miss Earth Foundation
 Miss Earth Foundation Kids' I Love My Planet

2005
2005 in the Philippines
2005 beauty pageants
Beauty pageants in the Philippines